One third of Eastleigh Borough Council is elected each year, followed by one year without election.

Political control

Leadership
The leaders of the council since 1976 have been:

Council elections
1973 Eastleigh Borough Council election
1976 Eastleigh Borough Council election (New ward boundaries)
1979 Eastleigh Borough Council election
1980 Eastleigh Borough Council election
1982 Eastleigh Borough Council election
1983 Eastleigh Borough Council election
1984 Eastleigh Borough Council election
1986 Eastleigh Borough Council election (Borough boundary changes took place but the number of seats remained the same)
1987 Eastleigh Borough Council election
1988 Eastleigh Borough Council election
1990 Eastleigh Borough Council election
1991 Eastleigh Borough Council election
1992 Eastleigh Borough Council election
1994 Eastleigh Borough Council election
1995 Eastleigh Borough Council election
1996 Eastleigh Borough Council election
1998 Eastleigh Borough Council election
1999 Eastleigh Borough Council election
2000 Eastleigh Borough Council election
2002 Eastleigh Borough Council election (New ward boundaries)
2003 Eastleigh Borough Council election
2004 Eastleigh Borough Council election
2006 Eastleigh Borough Council election
2007 Eastleigh Borough Council election
2008 Eastleigh Borough Council election
2010 Eastleigh Borough Council election
2011 Eastleigh Borough Council election
2012 Eastleigh Borough Council election
2014 Eastleigh Borough Council election
2015 Eastleigh Borough Council election
2016 Eastleigh Borough Council election
2018 Eastleigh Borough Council election (New ward boundaries)
2019 Eastleigh Borough Council election
2021 Eastleigh Borough Council election
2022 Eastleigh Borough Council election

District result maps

By-election results

References

External links
Eastleigh Borough Council

 
Politics of the Borough of Eastleigh
Council elections in Hampshire
District council elections in England